Charlotte Hooper Rosshandler (born 1943) is a Canadian-American photographer.

Her work is included in the collections of the National Gallery of Canada, and the Art Gallery of Guelph.

References

20th-century Canadian women artists
20th-century American women artists
21st-century American photographers
20th-century American photographers
1943 births
Living people
21st-century American women